Khvorheh or Khurheh or Khoorheh or Khowrheh, also rendered as Khurreh, may refer to:
 Temple of Khvorheh
 Khvorheh, Lorestan, a village in Lorestan Province, Iran
Khurheh, Markazi, a village in Markazi Province, Iran
Khurheh Rural District, an administrative subdivision of Markazi Province, Iran